Hocus-pocus is an exclamation used by magicians, usually the magic words spoken when bringing about some sort of change.

Hocus Pocus or Hokus Pokus or variant, may also refer to:

Books
 Hocus Pocus (novel), a 1990 novel by Kurt Vonnegut
 Hocus Pocus: A Tale of Magnificent Magicians, a 2007 book by illusionist Paul Kieve
 Hokus Pokus, the 2007 book in the Sisterhood: Rules of the Game series by Fern Michaels

Film, television, and plays
 Hokuspokus, a 1926 German play by Curt Goetz
 Hokuspokus (film), a 1930 German film adaptation of the 1926 Curt Goetz play, directed by Gustav Ucicky
 Hocuspocus (1953 film), a West German film, starring Curt Goetz himself, directed by Kurt Hoffmann
 Hocuspocus (1966 film), a West German film in color, directed by Kurt Hoffmann
 Hokus Pokus (1949 film), the 115th short subject starring American slapstick comedy team the Three Stooges
 Hocus Pocus, the rabbit who turns on his magician owner, Professor Hinkle in the 1969 Christmas television special Frosty the Snowman
 Hokus Pokus, a 1989 skateboarding video released by H-Street
 Hocus Pocus (1993 film), a Halloween-themed fantasy-comedy film by Disney, starring Bette Midler, Sarah Jessica Parker, and Kathy Najimy
 "Hocus Pocus" (SpongeBob SquarePants), a 2007 SpongeBob SquarePants episode from Season 4
 "Hocus Pocus" (QI), a 2010 episode of the UK TV series

Gaming
 Hocus Pocus (video game), a 1994 Apogee MS-DOS game

Music

Band
 Hocus Pocus, a 1967 music band later known as Heart
 Hocus Pocus, a 1968 music band later known as UFO
 Hocus Pocus, a 1994 music band previously known as Doop
 Hocus Pocus (group), a 1995 French hip-hop group

Album
 Hocus Pocus (soundtrack), a soundtrack album from the 1993 film
 Hocus Pocus (Enon album), a 2003 indie rock album by Enon
 Hocus Pocus (Kaela Kimura album), a 2009 J-pop album by Kaela Kimura

Song
 "Hocus Pocus" (song), a 1971 song by the Dutch rock group Focus
 "Hokus Pokus" (Insane Clown Posse song), a 1997 song from the studio album The Great Milenko
 "Hocus Pocus", a 2016 song by Animal Collective from Painting With

See also

 
 
 
 
 Sir Hokus of Pokes, a character in Wizard of Oz
 Griever de Hocus, a character from Griever: An American Monkey King in China
 Hoku (disambiguation)
 Point-of-care ultrasound (POCUS)
 Poku (surname)